Witches Cauldron is an ice-filled basin on the west side of the Douglas Range, immediately west of Mount Egbert in the north part of Alexander Island, Antarctica. The basin was first sighted from the air and roughly mapped by the British Graham Land expedition in 1937. More accurately mapped from air photos taken by the Ronne Antarctic Research Expedition in 1947–48, by Searle of the Falkland Islands Dependencies Survey in 1960. Named by the UK Antarctic Place-Names Committee for the feature's kettle-like shape.

References
 

Structural basins of Antarctica
Valleys of Alexander Island